Karishma Tanna Bangera (born 21 December 1983) is an Indian actress, model and anchor who predominantly works in Hindi films and television shows. She made her television debut with Kyunki Saas Bhi Kabhi Bahu Thi in 2001. She is well known for her roles in Naagin 3 and Qayamat Ki Raat. She was a contestant on the reality show Bigg Boss 8 in 2014, where she emerged as the 1st runner-up. In 2020, she participated in Fear Factor: Khatron Ke Khiladi 10 and emerged as the winner.

She also appeared in other reality shows like Zara Nachke Dikha 1 (2008), Nach Baliye 7 (2015) and Jhalak Dikhhla Jaa 9 (2016).
Tanna made her film debut as Nandini Thapar with Suneel Darshan's Dosti: Friends Forever (2006). In 2013, she was seen in Indra Kumar's successful comedy Grand Masti. In 2018, she featured in Rajkumar Hirani's biopic of Sanjay Dutt titled Sanju. The same year, she entered the digital world with ALT Balaji's web series Karrle Tu Bhi Mohabbat as Zoya Hussain.

Early life
Tanna was born on born 21 December 1983 and brought up in a Gujarati family. She lives with her mother, and is very close to her; her father died in October 2012

Career

2000–2006: Acting debut and Dosti: Friends Forever 

Tanna first appeared in Balaji Telefilms' soap opera Kyunki Saas Bhi Kabhi Bahu Thi where she played the role of Indu. She then appeared in the show Kahi To Milenge.

Tanna played the female lead in the TV series Kkoi Dil Mein Hai as Krutika. She later appeared in Ek Ladki Anjaani Si playing the negative role of Ayesha. Tanna made her Bollywood debut with the 2005 film Dosti: Friends Forever, playing Nandini Thapar.

Tanna has also acted in several television advertisements, including Stayfree, Lifebuoy and Nirma. She was also a part of Rajshri Productions' Pyaar Ke Do Naam: Ek Raadha, Ek Shyaam. In September 2006, Tanna made her theater debut with the Hinglish romantic comedy Perfect Wedding, directed by Vandana Sajnani. The work was adapted from Robin Howdon's British play of the same name.

2007–2013: Television hosting and Grand Masti 
Tanna participated in the stage-based comedy TV series Comedy Circus, that started in June 2007. She later came back in Comedy Circus Mahasangram in February 2010. In 2008, she participated in Zara Nachke Dikha and won the show along with her team. She later participated in Kaun Jeetega Bollywood Ka Ticket and Kaho Na Yaar Hai.

She presented reality shows like Kaante Ki Takkar and Comedy Champions. Tanna hosted a magic-based reality TV show, India's Magic Star in July 2010. In August 2010, she participated in Imagine TV's Meethi Choori No 1. She also played the role of Avni in Star One's Jaane Pehchaane Se... Ye Ajnabbi.

In 2011, she participated in Zor Ka Jhatka: Total Wipeout. The same year, she played Ms Jaffery in Sony TV's Adaalat. In 2012, she acted in the children's television program Baal Veer, playing the role of Rani Pari.

In September 2013, Grand Masti, a Bollywood sex comedy and a sequel to April 2004 film, Masti was released in which Tanna starred as Unatti.

2014–present: Bigg Boss 8, Naagin 3 and further success 
Tanna was a contestant on the popular controversial reality show, Bigg Boss 8. She spent 4 months inside the house and became the 1st runner-up. In 2015, Tanna participated in the dance reality show Nach Baliye 7 along with Upen Patel and emerged as the 2nd runner-up.

In March 2016, Karishma made a guest appearance in the popular stunt reality show Fear Factor: Khatron Ke Khiladi 7.  She also appeared as a guest in the popular comedy show Comedy Nights Bachao, which aired on Colors TV. Karishma participated in the popular dance reality show Jhalak Dikhhla Jaa 9 in 2016. Tanna also played the role of Maskeeni in Life OK's show Naagarjuna – Ek Yoddha. In January 2017, Tanna judged BIG Magic's reality show Big Memsaab along with Sambhavna Seth and Pritam Singh.

In April 2018, she appeared in ALT Balaji's Karrle Tu Bhi Mohabbat as Zoya Hussain. In May 2018, Tanna played the cameo role of Ruhi in Colors TV's popular supernatural series Naagin 3. In June 2018, Tanna acted in Rajkumar Hirani's film Sanju and played the lead in Ekta Kapoor's Qayamat Ki Raat as Gauri.

In February 2019, Tanna appeared on Kitchen Champion 5 along with Karan Tacker. Later in May 2019, she appeared on Khatra Khatra Khatra. In 2020, she participated in Fear Factor: Khatron Ke Khiladi 10 and emerged as the winner. In November 2020, she appeared in Suraj Pe Mangal Bhari in the song "Basanti". In 2021, Tanna appeared in the web series Bullets as Lolo.

Personal life 
Tanna started dating  actor Upen Patel in 2014 when they met inside the Bigg Boss 8 house and later was engaged to him. In 2016, they ended their relationship.

 
Tanna started dating a Mumbai-based real estate businessman Varun Bangera in 2021. In the same year, they got engaged in an intimate ceremony. She married Varun Bangera on  5 February 2022.

Filmography

Films

Television

Special appearances

Web series

Music videos

Awards and nominations

See also 

 List of Indian television actresses

References

External links 

 
 
 

Living people
1983 births
Actresses in Hindi cinema
Actresses in Kannada cinema
Indian film actresses
Indian television actresses
21st-century Indian actresses
Actresses from Mumbai
Actresses in Hindi television
Gujarati people
Bigg Boss (Hindi TV series) contestants
Big Brother (franchise) contestants
Fear Factor: Khatron Ke Khiladi participants